Ron Burgess may refer to:

 Ron Burgess (footballer) (1917–2005), footballer and manager
 Ronald L. Burgess Jr. (born 1952), US Army general